Luthe or Lüthe is a German language surname. It stems from the male given name Ludwig – and may refer to:
Andreas Luthe (1987), German professional footballer
Claus Luthe (1932–2008), German car designer
Gregor Luthe (1970), German chemist, toxicologist, nanotechnologist, inventor and entrepreneur
Hubert Luthe (1927–2014), German Catholic bishop
Josephine M. Luthe (19th-century), American lawyer
Wolfgang Luthe (1922–1985), German physician and psychotherapist

References 

German-language surnames
Surnames from given names